{{DISPLAYTITLE:C12H22O4}}
The molecular formula C12H22O4 (molar mass: 230.30 g/mol, exact mass: 230.1518 u) may refer to:

 Dodecanedioic acid (DDDA)
 1,6-Hexanediol diglycidyl ether